Ezra J. McCandless (born Monica Kay; October 6, 1997) is an American murderer who was convicted of the murder of Alex Woodworth, who was stabbed 16 times in the head, neck, groin and torso in March 2018.

Background 
McCandless was born on October 6, 1997, to 14-year-old Roselenna Gunelson, in Stanley, Wisconsin. Her name at birth was Monica Kay. Her biological father was not a part of her life. Her mother’s partner, Joshane Karlen, adopted McCandless when she was four years old. They divorced when Ezra was 12 years old, but she continued to have a close relationship with her father. During high school, she decided to try out different names and pronouns. She then legally changed her name to Ezra McCandless. She chose McCandless after Chris McCandless, whose life is the subject of the book and film Into The Wild.  After she dropped out of college she moved to the city of Eau Claire, Wisconsin.

Towards the end of summer 2017, she met Jason Mengel, a 33-year-old National Guard medic. The two embarked on a romantic relationship and moved in together in August 2017. Around the same time, McCandless met 23-year-old barista and substitute teacher Alex Woodworth at a coffee house.

In early fall 2017, she found out she was pregnant with Mengel’s child. She drove to Minneapolis to have an abortion, and had the procedure done on October 6, 2017, which was also her birthday. Not long after, she began a secret romantic relationship with Woodworth.

At the beginning of February 2018, McCandless alleged that she was sexually assaulted by one of Mengel’s friends, John Hansen, while she was passed out. Detectives investigating the claim interviewed Alex Woodworth and he did not support McCandless’s versions of events. The case was later dropped.

In mid-February 2018, while Mengel was away on two weeks of National Guard duty, McCandless moved back to her mother's house in Stanley, Wisconsin. When he returned, the pair would meet at hotels. During one of the hotel stays, Mengel read messages on McCandless’s phone and found out about her relationships with both Woodworth and Hansen, of which she claimed the latter was an assault. Mengel confronted both Hansen and Woodworth. There was a public argument with the three over the alleged assault and relationships at a Racys coffee shop, in Eau Claire.

McCandless blamed Woodworth for the ending of her and Mengel’s relationship. On February 24, 2018, she sent a text message to Woodworth telling him to not talk to her ever again. McCandless continued to talk with Mengel. She sent him journals in which she expressed her upset at having betrayed him. She had wanted to deliver them to him herself, but he refused, and asked her to send them by other means.

Murder 
On March 22, 2018, McCandless turned up unannounced and saw ex-boyfriend Jason Mengel at Racy D'Lenes Coffee Lounge in Eau Claire. She was seen on the coffee shop's security footage. Mengel later mentioned that McCandless had seemed agitated. McCandless left the coffee shop and went to visit Woodworth at his house, as she claimed she had some items to return to him. Mengel said that he felt there was something odd about the way she was acting and things she had said.

Mengel rode his bike to Woodworth’s house in an attempt to find McCandless and spotted her 2003 Chevy Impala outside, the car's engine still running. While waiting for McCandless, he was seen outside pacing back and forth by a passerby, who thought it looked suspicious and phoned the police. After waiting for around 45 minutes, Mengel went inside the house without knocking. He stated that he found McCandless and Woodworth in the middle of a conversation. He walked back outside to wait for them to finish talking and was met by the Eau Claire police. Mengel explained to the officers that he was there because he was concerned about McCandless, as “she was not acting like herself”. In police dash cam footage, an officer can then be seen speaking to Woodworth outside of his house, who is standing next to McCandless’s car. McCandless was sitting in her car in the drivers seat, but is not visible in the video. At about 1:05 pm, satisfied that there was not a problem, the officers and Mengel left. This was the last time he saw Woodworth alive.

A few hours later, about 4:15 pm, McCandless knocked on the door of dairy farmer Don Sipple, in Spring Brook, near Eau Claire. She was covered in mud, blood and bruises, and barefoot. She asked for a doctor, claiming she was a victim of an assault.

She was taken to a local hospital, where she asked for Jason Mengel. She initially told officers, paramedics and hospital staff that she could not remember what had happened.

Detectives were unable to find Woodworth that night. The next day while searching around the dairy farm, officers saw bloody footprints on the ground. They then found Woodworth's body hanging out of the back of McCandless’s 2003 Chevy Impala on a dirt road, near the farmhouse. He had suffered 16 stab wounds to his head, neck, groin and torso. The car was stuck in the dirt.

Arrest and trial 

Two weeks after Alex Woodworth was found dead, on April 6, 2018, McCandless was arrested and charged with first-degree intentional homicide.

The trial started on October 15, 2019, at the Dunn County Judicial Center, 18 months after the stabbing. At the trial, the prosecution highlighted the inconsistencies in McCandless’s stories and the crime scene. She was unable to recall what had happened when first interviewed, and told officers and paramedics that arrived at the farm that she could not remember. In a recorded interview, after Dunn County officers told her that they had found her car and Alex’s body, she eventually said that he had attacked her, and said she had not been able to get it out of her head. She claimed he had also carved ‘BOY’ into her arm. which she later admitted was her own doing. She changed her story of the attack from when she was first interviewed, to the trial. She initially stated “And I cut my hand, because I kept trying to grab him. And then I finally got free, and I finally got the knife away from him”. She later said at the trial, “I decided then to knee him in the groin, and he drops the knife at that point. Instantly, I grab the knife. I started stabbing him anywhere and everywhere I could”. McCandless claimed that Woodworth had attacked her in the back seat of her car, however most of the blood evidence at the scene was found outside of the car.  In an interview, prior to Alex’s body being found, she had said that the incident happened at Owen Park, in Eau Claire, which the prosecution says was to direct authorities away from the real scene.

The knife used to kill Woodworth was confirmed to be from McCandless’s father’s house. Her father, Joshane, stated at the trial he had previously given his daughter knives.

Dr. Tillotson, who had treated McCandless in the ER and assessed her injuries, testified that her knife wounds appeared to have the characteristics of self-inflicted wounds. He also said she had trouble recalling what had happened, and had asked for Jason Mengel.

McCandless took Woodworth’s phone when she left the scene. The prosecution alleged this was to leave him no means of being able to contact anyone, had he been able to.
They also said McCandless had stabbed Woodworth in hopes of preventing him getting in the way of her rekindling her relationship with Mengel .

The defense claimed that Woodworth was angry that McCandless did not want to be with him. Her defense attorney stated that she was fighting for her life after Woodworth forced himself upon her, and then attacked her.

She testified that she had stabbed him in self-defense, and she just wanted to try and get away.

Conviction and sentencing 
On November 1, 2019, McCandless was convicted of stabbing to death 24-year-old Woodworth. She was held at Dunn County Jail in Menomonie, Wisconsin until her sentencing date.

On February 7, 2020, McCandless was sentenced to life in prison, with eligibility for parole after 50 years, for the first-degree intentional homicide of Alex Woodworth. McCandless’s mother, Roselenna Gunelson, pleaded with the court to grant her daughter the possibility to petition for parole after 20 years. Woodworth’s aunt, Crystal Hall, said in her impact statement at the sentencing, “throughout the trial we never saw any sign of sadness, shame, compassion, or the slight bit of remorse for what you had done”.

She is currently incarcerated at Taycheedah Correctional Institution in Fond du Lac, Wisconsin.

References 

Living people
American female murderers
Prisoners sentenced to life imprisonment by Wisconsin
People convicted of murder by Wisconsin
People from Eau Claire, Wisconsin
People from Stanley, Wisconsin
Violence against men in North America
1997 births